The Journal of Sociolinguistics is a peer-reviewed academic journal that covers topics in sociolinguistics. Its scope encompasses a wide range of languages treated from a multidisciplinary point of view. It was established in 1997 and appears four times a year. It is published by Wiley-Blackwell and the current editor in chief is Monica Heller (sociolinguist),(University of Toronto).

Abstracting and indexing 
The journal is indexed in the following services:

 Academic Search and Academic Search Premier
 Communication & Mass Media Index
 CSA Biological Sciences Database
 CSA Environmental Sciences & Pollution Management Database
 Current Contents/Social & Behavioral Sciences
 Ecology Abstracts
 Educational Research Abstracts Online
 FRANCIS
 IBR & IBZ: International Bibliographies of Periodical Literature
 Journal Citation Reports, Social Science Edition
 Linguistics & Language Behavior Abstracts
 PsycINFO
 Social Sciences Citation Index
 Social Services Abstracts
 SocINDEX
 Sociological Abstracts

According to the Journal Citation Reports, the journal has a 2016 impact factor of 1.200.

References

External links 
 

Sociolinguistics journals
English-language journals
Wiley-Blackwell academic journals
Publications established in 1997
5 times per year journals